Halla Bol (Raise Your Voice) is an Indian Hindi-language drama film directed by Rajkumar Santoshi. Halla Bol stars Ajay Devgn and Vidya Balan in pivotal roles and a number of celebrities from the Hindi and other film industries appear as themselves. Produced by Samee Siddiqui, the film's score and soundtrack was composed by Sukhwinder Singh, while Natarajan Subramaniam and Steven Bernard were the cinematographer and editor respectively. It was released on 11 January 2008.

The film touches upon the Jessica Lall murder case, Aamir Khan's involvement with the Narmada Bachao Andolan, the Right to Information Act, and public participation in fighting corruption. It also references the theatre group Jan Natya Manch, whose leader, theatre activist Safdar Hashmi, was killed by political rivals while performing a street play by the same name, Halla Bol!, in 1989.

Plot
Ashfaque (Ajay Devgn) is a small town boy aspiring to be a film star in the Hindi film industry. He joins a street theatre group run by a reformed dacoit Sidhu (Pankaj Kapur), who uses street theatre as a medium to bring about an awakening in the masses. Ashfaque struggles to give a creative vent to the actor in him in order to realise his dreams. Ashfaque's determined struggle pays off and he gets a break in films. He gets a new screen name – Sameer Khan. He moves up the success ladder in a very short time.

Soon, he becomes Sameer Khan the superstar. Amidst all the adulation and applause, he slowly loses his own identity. He forgets his real self and imbibes all characteristics of the various roles played by him on screen. Corruption overtakes his entire system, alienating him from all loved ones, including his wife Sneha (Vidya Balan).

Cast
 Ajay Devgn as Ashfaaq Khan
 Vidya Balan as Sneha Khan
 Pankaj Kapur as Sidhu
 Darshan Jariwala as Ganpatrao Gaekwad
 Sanjai Mishra as Sameer's manager
 Abhay Bhargava
 Anupam Shyam
 Aanjjan Srivastav as Amanullah Khan
 Sulbha Arya as Nazma Khan
 Iqbal Dosani as a Police Commissioner
 Rahul Kanawat as Ranveer 
 Deepak Pandit as Police Inspector Rathod
 Arun Behll as a Reporter
 Sitaram Panchal
 Rushita Singh
 Mukesh Tiwari

Special appearances
 Prabhu Chawla as himself
 Lekh Tandon as himself
 Tusshar Kapoor as himself
 Sana Khan as herself
 Jackie Shroff as himself
 Ruby Bhatia as herself
 Sayali Bhagat in the song "Is Pal Ki Soch"
 Pahlaj Nihalani as himself 
 Kareena Kapoor as herself 
 Neeraj Vora as himself
 Amjad Sabri as himself at Dargah

Special appearances at the award ceremony (in order of appearance):

 Javed Jaffrey
 Rishi Kapoor
 Ranjit Kapoor
 Randhir Kapoor
 Vinod Khanna
 Kabir Bedi
 Mammootty 
 Mohanlal
 Ritesh Deshmukh
 Abhishek Bachchan
 Katrina Kaif
 Prabhu Chawla
 Arshad Warsi
 R. Madhavan
 Shilpa Shetty
 Preity Zinta
 Anil Kapoor
 Sridevi
 Boney Kapoor

Casting
Priyanka Chopra was the original choice for the lead actress role. However, she opted out of the film to work on another film that too was to be directed by Raj Kumar Santoshi, London Dreams (2009) although she was replaced by Asin Thottumkal in that film. Raj Kumar Santhoshi left that film and Priyanka Chopra was removed from London Dreams.

Soundtrack
The film's music was composed by Singer and Composer Sukhwinder Singh.

 "Jab Tak Hai Dum" – Sukhwinder Singh
 "Shabad Gurbani" – Sukhwinder Singh
 "Is Pal Ki Soch" – Harshdeep Kaur
 "More Haji Piya" – Amjad Farid Sabri
 "Barsan Lagi" – Sneha Pant
 "Halla Bol Theme" – Instrumental

References

External links
 
 
 

2008 films
2008 drama films
Films about actors
Films about corruption in India
Films directed by Rajkumar Santoshi
2000s Hindi-language films
Films about Bollywood
Cultural depictions of actors
Indian drama films
Hindi-language drama films